Colin Waterson (born 14 July 1959) is  a former Australian rules footballer who played with Richmond in the Victorian Football League (VFL).

In 1982 he moved to Western Australia where he continued to play football for East Fremantle in the West Australian Football League (WAFL).

Notes

External links 
		
	

Living people
1959 births
Australian rules footballers from Victoria (Australia)
Richmond Football Club players
East Fremantle Football Club players
Western Australian State of Origin players